Schutzmannschaft Battalion 202 was a failed collaborationist auxiliary police battalion in the General Government during World War II. It was made up of 360 conscripts with German leadership. The unit was created in Kraków on March 27, 1942 with recruitment beginning in May. Only two Polish men volunteered. As a result, the Germans resorted to conscription from the regular Polish city-police called Einheimische Polizei. Once in Volhynia, the battalion stationed in Łuck originally. Soon later, in around Kostopol, half the members deserted to Polish resistance 27th Home Army Infantry Division, in defence of ethnic Polish population against the UPA massacres, and also committed a number of crimes against the civilian population, participating in the pacification of Ukrainian villages. Additional 60 Poles were rounded up and executed by the Nazis for mutiny.

Background
During formation, the battalion stationed in Kraków at Michałowskiego street (renamed Luxemburgstrasse). Basic training took place in Dębica. Its first commandant was Captain Tschnadel. Members wore green uniforms of Orpo and received Mauser 98 rifles before transfer to occupied Eastern Poland with the intention of fighting Soviet partisans behind the front-line of Operation Barbarossa. All Schutzmannschaften auxiliary police battalions were formed by the Germans from inhabitants of occupied territories i.e. in the General Government; as support for the German Sicherheitspolizei (security police) which was understaffed. At one point, a number of conscripted policemen in occupied eastern Poland included 5,000–12,000 Ukrainians and 2,000–2,200 Poles, mostly pitted against each other.

Identified by Grzegorz Motyka as the Polnisches Schutzmannschaftsbataillon 202, upon transfer to Volhynia and Podolia, the unit became subordinate to the German Schutzpolizei. The volunteer recruitment in Kraków yielded only 2 men, and yet, the German forcible draft from amongst professional members the Blue Police in the city decimated the force essential in combating property crimes and common banditry which skyrocketed after the 1939 invasion of Poland. Some dodged the draft, therefore another method included false advertisements for paid work in "Polish [not German] Police".

The German Major Walery Sauermann was made the commander of the unit in the field. The Germans made up all of the officers. In November 1943 more than half of the battalion deserted. Counting all Volhynian Schutzmannschaften (not only Battalion 202) at least 700 Poles trained by the Germans joined the 27th Volhynian Division of the Armia Krajowa, additional 60 Poles were executed for mutiny in Jarmolińce. One of the most widely quoted reasons among the Poles for joining the unit was a desire to offer protection for civilians against the wave of massacres of Poles in Volhynia. In fact, this particular unit was the only German-trained Polish participant in operations against OUN-UPA. The battalion was practically destroyed in combat with the Red Army at the beginning of 1944. The remains of the unit were transferred to Lwów (Lviv). Officially the battalion was disbanded on May 8, 1944. The battalion was armed with Mauser Mk 98k rifles and MP38 and MP41 submachine guns. It is believed that some of its former members subsequently joined the Blue Police in the General Government.

See also
 Schutzmannschaft Battalion 107
 Żagiew (collaborationist group permitted to bear firearms in the Nazi German-occupied Poland)

Notes

Bibliography
  G. Motyka, M. Wierzbicki; "Polski policjant na Wołyniu" in Kwartalnik Historyczny KARTA 24, 1998, pp. 126–140, ISSN 0867-3764
  Іван Дерейко. Місцеві формування німецької армії та поліції у Райхскомісаріаті «Україна». (1941–1944 роки).

Polish Auxiliary Police
Organizations established in 1942
Organizations disestablished in 1944
1942 establishments in Poland